The Cameron Years is a two-part 2019 documentary television series on the premiership of David Cameron. Drawing on an exclusive interview with Cameron, the series explores his leadership, the events that led to the EU referendum, and his impact on British politics. The airing of the programme in September coincided with The Cameron Interview on ITV.

Leading politicians connected to Cameron appeared on the programme, including George Osborne, Iain Duncan Smith, Michael Heseltine, Michael Gove, and Nick Clegg (Deputy Prime Minister, 2010–15).

Episodes

Reception 
The New Statesman described the mini-series as "a parade of entitlement, cowardice and careerism". Writing in The Times, Hugo Rifkind said of the former Prime Minister, "his poshness is in another league".

The Independent's Sean O'Grady wrote "He [David Cameron] is destined to be eternally friendless. He certainly comes across as very lonely and despondent in The Cameron Years".

References

External links 
 

2019 British television series debuts
2019 British television series endings
2010s British documentary television series
2010s British political television series
BBC television documentaries
English-language television shows